Le Cheval Blanc is a mountain in the Chablais Alps on the Swiss-French border. It overlooks the lake of Vieux Emosson on its eastern side.

References

External links
 Le Cheval Blanc on Hikr.org

Mountains of the Alps
Mountains of Valais
Mountains of Haute-Savoie
International mountains of Europe
France–Switzerland border
Mountains of Switzerland
Two-thousanders of Switzerland